Buivydžiai is a village in Vilnius District Municipality, Lithuania. According to the 2011 census, it had 272 residents. The village is situated on the left bank of the Neris River near its confluence with tributary Buivydė.

Early references to the place are dated by 1537. The name is most probably derived from the Lithuanian name Buivydas.
The village eventually developed around a manor, acquired by noble Cyprian Brzostowski in the first half of 17th century. Later the manor was reconstructed by architect Laurynas Gucevičius.

A wooden octagonal church, named after Saint George, was built in 1785. The church burned down in 1982; a brick replacement church was completed in 1986.

References 

Villages in Vilnius County
Vilensky Uyezd
Wilno Voivodeship (1926–1939)
Vilnius District Municipality